Koyye Moshenu Raju is an Indian politician and Member of Andhra Pradesh Legislative Council who is serving as Chairperson of Andhra Pradesh Legislative Council. He was nominated for the post by YSR Congress Party.

References 

Chairs of the Andhra Pradesh Legislative Council
Members of the Andhra Pradesh Legislative Council
People from Andhra Pradesh
Year of birth missing (living people)
Living people